.ve is the Internet country code top-level domain (ccTLD) for Venezuela.

On 3 March 2009 the ISO 3166-1 code for Venezuela changed to reflect the VE used for the ccTLD.

Registrations are allowed without restrictions, only at the third level:
 .arts.ve - artistic and cultural institution
 .co.ve - a website originally ".com" ported to Venezuelan Spanish
 .com.ve - Venezuelan commercial entity
 .info.ve - informational sites
 .net.ve - network service providers
 .org.ve - non-profit organizations
 .radio.ve - radio stations
 .web.ve - individuals

The following second-level domains allow restricted third-level domain registrations:
 .gob.ve / .gov.ve - government-related websites
 .edu.ve - Venezuela based educational institutions
 .int.ve - International institutions
 .mil.ve - Venezuelan military institution
 .tec.ve - University of Technology
Internationalized domain names are available using the following Spanish characteres: á, é, í, ó, ú, ü, and ñ.

A number of second-level domain names are in place, i.e., cha.ve, internet.ve, ipv6.ve, nic.ve

References

External links

 IANA .ve whois information

Country code top-level domains
Telecommunications in Venezuela

sv:Toppdomän#V